Nocera Inferiore ( or simply , , locally ) is a town and comune in the province of Salerno, in Campania in southern Italy. It lies west of Nocera Superiore, at the foot of Monte Albino, some 20 km east-southeast of Naples by rail.

History

The ancient city of Nuceria Alfaterna was situated nearby in Nocera Superiore. Some of the city's necropoli were located in the area of Nocera Inferiore. 

Its post-Roman history until 1851 is in common with Nocera Superiore.

Post-Roman history

At an early date, the city became an episcopal see, and in the 12th century, it sided with Innocent II against Roger of Sicily, suffering severely for its choice.

By the end of the 15th century, until 1806, Nuceria had the epithet ("of the pagans", Nuceria Paganorum). Today  the town of Pagani lies about one 1.5 km to the west.

In 1385 Pope Urban VI was besieged in the castle by Charles III of Naples.

The origins of the name

The current name, Nocera Inferiore, derives from the Italianization of the dialectal toponym Nuceria and from the geographical position of the city that, in 1806, was born from the division of Nocera dei Pagani, sanctioning the birth of five municipalities, including the two Noceras, differentiated according to their height above sea level.

Main sights

One of the most beautiful places to visit in Nocera Inferiore is the medieval castle. Strategically located on the top of Santa Andrea's hill, this fortified structure was founded in the 9th century. In 1138 it was destroyed by the troops of Ruggero II.  
Helena, the widow of Manfred of Sicily, was imprisoned in the Castle and died here after the battle of Benevento (1268). Here also Urban VI imprisoned the cardinals who favoured the Antipope Clement VII.

The castle also had as guests the writers Dante Alighieri and Boccaccio.

Symbols
The city coat of arms shows a walnut tree with golden fruits. On the red frame of the shield is written "Urbs Nuceria" in Roman letters. On the top there is a castellated crown, whereas at the bottom there is a laurel branch with golden berries and an oak branch with golden acorns tied together with the Italian tricolour ribbon. The city coat of arms has been renewed recently by Antonio Pecoraro.

Since 2017 "Verrà dalla memoria" has been the anthemn of Nocera Inferiore. Lyrics were written by Teresa Staiano and music was composed by Father Carmine Ferraioli.

Monuments

Churches
Cathedral of san Prisco and San Marco (10th century)
Church of San Matteo (10th century)
Convent of San Giovanni in Parco (12th century)
Church of Sant'Angelo in grotta (12th century)
Monastery of Santa Chiara (13th century)
 (13th century)
 (13th century)
Church of the Corpo di Cristo (16th century)
Convent of Sant'Andrea (16th century)
Sanctuary of Santa Maria dei Miracoli (16th century)
Church of San Bartolomeo (18th century)
Church of San Giuseppe (20th century)

Castle
Castello del Parco (10th century)

Buildings
Torre Guerritore (19th century)
Palazzo Vescovile (16th century)
Curia diocesana (18th century)
Palazzo ducale (16th century)
Caserma Bruno Tofano (18th century)
Palazzo Lanzara (17th century)
Palazzo del Liceo Classico (20th century)
Villa Piccolomini d'Aragona (20th century)

Museums
Art gallery of Sant'Antonio convent
Diocesan Museum San Prisco
Archaeology museums of Agro nocerino

Notable people
Publius Sittius
Priscus martyr
Priscus of Nocera
Felix and Constantia
Antipope Laurentius
Beatrice of Provence
Helena Angelina Doukaina
Charles Martel of Anjou
San Ludovico D'Angiò, canonized on April 7, 1317 by John XXII
Dietrich of Nieheim
Pope Urban VI
Raimondo Del Balzo Orsini
Jacopo Sannazzaro, famous poet, humanist, and epigrammist
Nunzio Ferraiuoli, famous painter
Paolo Giovio
Bernardino Telesio
Orazio Solimena, famous painter
Angelo Solimena, famous painter
Francesco Solimena, famous painter in the Baroque era
Carlo Cafiero
Giuseppe Fanelli
Warren Cuccurullo
Domenico Rea
Mario Cuomo, whose father Andrea came from Nocera Inferiore
Pat Villani
Mino Raiola, football agent
Giammario Piscitella
Lorenzo Prisco, footballer
Michele Tarallo
Simone Barone, World Cup-winning footballer
Raffaele De Martino, footballer
Teresa Di Loreto
Joel Salvi
Isabella Adinolfi
Coez

Twin towns/cities 
Nocera inferiore is twinned with:
  Makarska, Croatia

Transportation
Nocera is connected with Naples, Avellino and Salerno by a branch railway.

Notes and references

See also
Diocese of Nocera Inferiore-Sarno
Alphabet of Nuceria
A.S.G. Nocerina
History of Islam in southern Italy
Saracinesco
Ciciliano

External links

Official Website

 
Arabs in Italy